Saroornagar Lake is a lake in Hyderabad, India. From the year of its creation in 1626, the lake remained largely clean until 1956 when Hyderabad expanded. After the restoration of the lake, migratory birds returned to the lake in large numbers a few years later.

History 
In 1626, the lake was created for agricultural and drinking purposes. It is one of five major water bodies in Hyderabad. After 1956 when Hyderabad became the state capital of the Andhra Pradesh, the city witnessed unprecedented population growth, industrialisation and agriculture using synthetic fertilizers and insecticides. Inevitably, untreated domestic sewage, solid waste and industrial effluents entered into the catchment area of this lake.

As a part of this initiative, two sewage treatment plants with the capacity to treat 250 million litres of sewage a day were to be installed. In addition to this, tourism-centric facilities such as a boating facility in the lake, a children's park and a restaurant were to be taken up. The minister also announced that all construction activity on the lake bed were to be stopped. Soon after, city's civic agency Hyderabad Urban Development Authority took up the task of cleaning up the lake.

Four years after the installation of the sewage treatment plant, the officials reported 95% of sewage being treated. With the groundwater conditions improved, migratory birds returned to the lake in big numbers. The park featured sculptures, ornamental landscape, boating facility and an environment education centre. Citizens of nearby localities such as L. B. Nagar and Vanasthalipuram welcomed this development. It has last its charm now

After the restoration, the civic agencies have taken necessary measures to prevent pollution from the annual immersion of Ganesh idols. In addition, measures were taken to curb unauthorised construction near the lake bed. However, by 2009, the filtration unit of the sewage treatment plant stopped functioning properly. As a result of this, the lake was getting polluted with domestic waste.

References 

Geography of Hyderabad, India
Artificial lakes of India
1626 establishments in India
Lakes of Hyderabad, India